James Thomas Wyman (born February 27, 1986) is an American former professional ice hockey right winger who played in the National Hockey League (NHL) with the Montreal Canadiens and the Tampa Bay Lightning.

Playing career
Wyman was originally drafted in the fourth round, 100th overall, by the Montreal Canadiens in the 2004 NHL Entry Draft. After attending The Blake School (Minneapolis), Wyman committed to a four-year collegiate career with Dartmouth College. Wyman was signed by the Canadiens to a two-year entry level contract. In the 2009–10 season, Wyman was recalled from AHL affiliate, the Hamilton Bulldogs, and made his NHL debut with the Canadiens against the Columbus Blue Jackets on November 24, 2009.

On July 1, 2011, Wyman was signed as an unrestricted free agent by the Tampa Bay Lightning.  On December 20, 2011, as a member of the Lighting, Wyman scored his first NHL goal against Carey Price of the Montreal Canadiens, the team that drafted him. Wyman appeared in a career high 40 games for the Lightning, recording 2 goals and 11 points.

On June 15, 2012, Wyman was re-signed by the Lightning to a one-year extension. Due to the NHL lockout, he was assigned to new Lightning AHL affiliate, the Syracuse Crunch. Wyman spent the majority of the 2012–13 season with the Crunch compiling 38 points in 76 games as the Crunch reached the Calder Cup finals. He was recalled by the Lightning to play in a solitary game against the Buffalo Sabres on April 14, 2013.

Wyman left the Lightning organization as a free agent and signed a one-year contract with the Colorado Avalanche on July 5, 2013. After attending the Avalanche training camp he was reassigned to AHL affiliate, the Lake Erie Monsters to begin the 2013–14 season. As a veteran on the Monsters, Wyman was selected as an alternate captain and remained with the club for the duration of the year. Unable to accumulate previous seasons production, Wyman finished with 7 goals and 22 points in 66 games. He was not re-signed by the Avalanche at the end of his contract and was released to free agency.

Unsigned, on September 17, 2014, Wyman accepted an invitation to attend the Vancouver Canucks 2014 training camp on a professional try-out. Upon his release from camp, Wyman signed a one-year contract abroad with German club, Thomas Sabo Ice Tigers of the DEL on October 7, 2014.

Career statistics

References

External links

1986 births
American men's ice hockey right wingers
Cincinnati Cyclones (ECHL) players
Dartmouth Big Green men's ice hockey players
Hamilton Bulldogs (AHL) players
Lake Erie Monsters players
Living people
Montreal Canadiens draft picks
Montreal Canadiens players
Norfolk Admirals players
People from Edina, Minnesota
Syracuse Crunch players
Tampa Bay Lightning players
Thomas Sabo Ice Tigers players
Ice hockey players from Minnesota